Ramón Corral Ávila (born 8 December 1946) is a Mexican lawyer and politician affiliated with the National Action Party. He served as Senator of the LVIII Legislature of the Mexican Congress representing Sonora, and a deputy in the LVII Legislature.

References

1946 births
Living people
People from Hermosillo
Politicians from Sonora
20th-century Mexican lawyers
Members of the Senate of the Republic (Mexico)
Members of the Chamber of Deputies (Mexico)
Members of the Congress of Chihuahua
National Action Party (Mexico) politicians
20th-century Mexican politicians
21st-century Mexican politicians